Peter Alan Schourek (born May 10, 1969) is an American former Major League Baseball left-handed pitcher who played for the New York Mets, Cincinnati Reds, Houston Astros, Boston Red Sox, and Pittsburgh Pirates from 1991 to 2001.

Schourek grew up in Falls Church, Virginia in the Washington Metropolitan Area and attended George C. Marshall High School in Falls Church (Fairfax County). 

In 1995 Schourek posted an 18-7 record with a 3.22 ERA. He gave up 2 runs in 14 IP in the postseason (1.26 ERA), but took an 0-1 record in 2 starts. He was the runner-up for the NL Cy Young Award, losing to Greg Maddux.

References

External links

1969 births
Living people
Major League Baseball pitchers
New York Mets players
Cincinnati Reds players
Houston Astros players
Boston Red Sox players
Kingsport Mets players
St. Lucie Mets players
Tidewater Tides players
Pawtucket Red Sox players
Columbia Mets players
Kissimmee Cobras players
Yuma Bullfrogs players
Sarasota Red Sox players
Pittsburgh Pirates players
Baseball players from Austin, Texas